Sybil Alexandra Burt is an American psychologist and behavior geneticist. She is professor of psychology at Michigan State University and the co-director of its Michigan State University Twin Registry. She is known for researching the role of genetic factors in parenting and popularity. She has also researched the link between antisocial behavior and marriage, finding that the relationship appears to be bidirectional: in her research, men with fewer antisocial behaviors were more likely to get married, and once they did so, their rates of antisocial behavior decreased even more.

References

External links
Faculty profile

Living people
American women psychologists
21st-century American psychologists
Michigan State University faculty
Behavior geneticists
Emory University alumni
University of Minnesota alumni
Year of birth missing (living people)
American women academics
21st-century American women